Gibeon railway station is a railway station serving the town of Gibeon in Namibia. It is part of the TransNamib Railway, and is located along the Windhoek to Upington line that connects Namibia with South Africa.

See also
Rail transport in Namibia

References

Railway stations in Namibia
TransNamib Railway
Buildings and structures in Hardap Region